Rob Friedman, also known by the moniker PitchingNinja, is an American baseball analyst and social media personality known for his pitching gifs and videos on Twitter and for creating social media resources for baseball recruiting and scouting. He is an analyst for Major League Baseball, Peacock (streaming service), Fox Sports, NESN and ESPN Friedman coached High School baseball and is also a licensed attorney.Friedman also founded Geolocation Software company Digital Envoy. As of January 2023, Friedman had approximately 425,000 followers on his PitchingNinja Twitter account. Friedman's PitchingNinja account has been referred to as "one of baseball’s most famous social media accounts" and "more formidable accounts in the baseball world". Friedman also has over 120,000 subscribers on the PitchingNinja YouTube channel.

Major League Baseball dispute and resolution 
In 2018, Friedman was briefly suspended from Twitter by Major League Baseball and Twitter, due to a copyright dispute, but eventually was reinstated and hired as an analyst for Major League Baseball, in what was seen as a potential change for baseball's restrictive social media policy. Since Friedman's reinstatement, his work has been featured on MLB.com.

Pitching Analyst 

Friedman creates pitching analysis videos and GIFs on Twitter and is a pitching analyst for ESPN Sunday Night Baseball, ESPN College Baseball and Major League Baseball.An ESPN article previewing the 2019 Major League Baseball postseason referred to certain pitchers as 'PitchingNinja Bait", meaning "A pitcher whose pitches are so unrepentantly sexy they are likely to be turned into GIFs by invaluable Twitterer, @pitchingninja."

During the 2019 season, Friedman also contributed to a weekly segment for "Changeup" on DAZN with Cespedes Family BBQ featuring each week's Major League Baseball pitching highlights and also a weekly segment for ESPN Sunday Night Baseball.

Friedman's analysis has frequently been used by journalists and media outlets to help visually illustrate the pitches of major league pitchers. Additionally, his work has also been credited by Major League and Minor League pitchers in helping them develop and refine their pitches. In 2020, Jake Diekman credited Friedman with helping him develop his Slider through interactions on Twitter. Yu Darvish also credited Friedman with helping improve his Slider (baseball). Cole Irvin said he learned his cutter from watching Corbin Burnes' interview with Friedman on Friedman's PitchingNinja YouTube Channel.

Friedman also gave the nickname "Airbender" to Devin Williams' changeup, which was called baseball's most "absurd" pitch.Friedman's coverage of Williams was credited with helping Williams win the National League's Major League Baseball Rookie of the Year Award.

Friedman's pitching analysis style has been described as "combin[ing] the knowledge of someone who studied pitching to help his young son improve with the wonderment of a fan who can’t help but plotz at how major leaguers are capable of manipulating a baseball."

Friedman was included in the Topps 2020 Allen And Ginter Baseball Card series due to his contributions to Baseball as a Pitching Analyst.

Friedman's PitchingNinja Twitter account was recognized by ESPN as helping to drive change in baseball's culture by adding flair and individuality to the game, and was #30 on the "67 Things Baseball Fans Can Be Grateful for in 2020" in Sports Illustrated.

At the 2021 Major League Baseball All-Star Game, Friedman convinced Liam Hendriks to throw a Knuckleball in exchange for a donation to charity, which was considered the 6th biggest All Star moment.
Trevor Bauer's Watch Momentum company sponsored Friedman's Pitching Ninja show on YouTube for a few months during the 2021 season, before Friedman and Momentum ended the sponsorship relationship in mid-2021.Friedman was awarded the "2020 Game Changer of the Year Award" from Lost Boyz Inc. for his support of their mission of helping inner-city youth through baseball.

For the 2022 season, Friedman joined the Peacock (streaming service) MLB team as lead Pitching Analyst on their broadcasts.  He also was named Major League Baseball Pitching Analyst for Fox Sports (United States) Friedman is a regular contributor to Fox Sports, writing about pitching, where he breaks down pitchers and their pitches, such as Shohei Ohtani and his new Sinker (pitch)  He is also the lead Pitching Analyst for FanDuel. Friedman's interview with Nolan Ryan was featured on the Blu-ray Disc recordable edition of the 2022 documentary "Facing Nolan."

PitchingNinja's FlatGround accounts 
In January 2019, Friedman started FlatGroundapp with a focus on pitchers getting recruited and scouted through social media.Friedman's FlatGroundApp account has been cited as a new development in baseball recruiting and scouting.FlatGround is followed by many Major League Baseball executives, which allows players to get free exposure.

Some of the professional pitchers who have credited Friedman and FlatGround with helping them get noticed by Major League affiliated organizations include: Justin Topa, Taylor Grover, Chris Dula, Chris Nunn, Nathan Patterson, Tyler Gillies, Casey Crosby, D. J. Snelten and Jordan Brink. In August 2019, Nathan Patterson's signing received coverage by national publications, where Patterson mentioned that the exposure he received due to a Viral video on FlatGroundapp and PitchingNinja assisted him in signing a professional contract with the Oakland Athletics. Patterson's signing has been referred to as Friedman's "most public success story."  In 2022, Friedman's tweet of independent league pitcher Logan Sawyer was credited with helping get him signed by the St. Louis Cardinals.

Additionally, in early 2019, a young baseball player, Jax Nystrom, who was highlighted on Friedman's FlatGroundBats account was contacted by Alex Bregman to hit with him in Spring Training, which was featured on MLB.com as well as other publications.

References

External links 

 PitchingNinja Official Twitter
 FlatGround Official Twitter
 FlatGround Hitting Official Twitter

American Internet celebrities
Living people
Baseball coaches from Georgia (U.S. state)
1966 births